Anna Maria Woodforde known as "Nancy"' (8 March 1757 – 13 January 1830) was an English housekeeper and diarist.

Life
Woodforde was born in Alhampton Court in Ditcheat, Somerset, in 1757. In 1780 she was taken in by her uncle as a companion and housekeeper. She was single and she was grateful for this opportunity to live in Weston Longville. Her uncle, James Woodforde was a cleric who was to achieve fame posthumously when his edited diary was published as "The Diary of a Country Parson". In the diary he refers to her as "Nancy" but switches to "Miss Woodforde" as she gets older and their relationship becomes less friendly. She is remembered for her correspondence and because she too produced a detailed diary for the year of 1792. She looked after her uncle until his death is 1803. She died in 1830.

Woodforde died in Castle Cary in 1830 and her death was reported in the Gentleman's Magazine. Her papers including some verse and her accounts are in the Bodleian Library.

References

1757 births
1830 deaths
Women diarists
English diarists
People from Somerset